2,4,5-Trihydroxycinnamic acid is a hydroxycinnamic acid found in rooibos tea. cis-2,4,5-Trihydroxycinnamic acid can be isolated from seeds of Alisma orientale.

References 

Hydroxycinnamic acids
Hydroxyquinols
Vinylogous carboxylic acids